The 1981 Asian Athletics Championships was the fourth edition of the biennial athletics competition for Asian nations, and was held from June 5-7, 1981 in Tokyo, Japan.

Medal summary

Men's events

Women's events

Medal table

References

Asian Athletics Championships from GBR Athletics

Asian Athletics Championships
International athletics competitions hosted by Japan
Sports competitions in Tokyo
Athletics in Tokyo
Asian
Asian Championships in Athletics
Asian Champion
Asian Athletics Championships